Robert F. Hughes is an American television director who worked on shows including The Angry Beavers and Rocko's Modern Life. He was a producer and one of the directors on Phineas and Ferb. On January 26, 2015, he announced he was leaving Phineas and Ferb for a job at Warner Bros. Television Animation. However, he soon returned to Disney to work on Milo Murphy's Law, a new series from Phineas and Ferb creators Dan Povenmire and Jeff "Swampy" Marsh. He has also directed on Bunnicula.

References

External links
 

American animators
American animated film directors
American animated film producers
Living people
Place of birth missing (living people)
American television directors
Disney Television Animation people
Nickelodeon Animation Studio people
1961 births